Óscar Pineda (born 4 April 1977) is a Guatemalan cyclist. He competed in the men's individual road race at the 2000 Summer Olympics.

References

External links
 

1977 births
Living people
Guatemalan male cyclists
Olympic cyclists of Guatemala
Cyclists at the 2000 Summer Olympics
Place of birth missing (living people)